Funfair may refer to:
 Amusement park
 Midway (fair)
 Sideshow alley (in Australia)
 Traveling carnival (US English)
 Travelling funfair (British English)
 Volksfest (in Germany)

Music
 "Funfair" (song), written for the 1968 musical film Chitty Chitty Bang Bang
 Funfair (Nobukazu Takemura album), released in 1999
 Funfair (Rip Slyme album), released in 2007

Other uses
 Funfair (horse), winner of the 2012 Colleen Stakes
 “Funfair” (Balamory) A Series 2 Episode

See also
 Fair (disambiguation)
 Fairground (disambiguation)
 Fun Fare (disambiguation)